

Electronegativity (Pauling scale)

Notes 
 Separate values for each source are only given where one or more sources differ.
 Electronegativity is not a uniquely defined property and may depend on the definition. The suggested values are all taken from WebElements as a consistent set.
 Many of the highly radioactive elements have values that must be predictions or extrapolations, but are unfortunately not marked as such. This is especially problematic for francium, which by relativistic calculations can be shown to be less electronegative than caesium, but for which the only value (0.7) in the literature predates these calculations.

Electronegativity (Allen scale)

References

WEL 
As quoted at http://www.webelements.com/ from these sources:
 A.L. Allred, J. Inorg. Nucl. Chem., 1961, 17, 215.
 J.E. Huheey, E.A. Keiter, and R.L. Keiter in Inorganic Chemistry : Principles of Structure and Reactivity, 4th edition, HarperCollins, New York, USA, 1993.

CRC 
As quoted from these sources in an online version of: David R. Lide (ed), CRC Handbook of Chemistry and Physics, 84th Edition. CRC Press. Boca Raton, Florida, 2003; Section 9, Molecular Structure and Spectroscopy; Electronegativity
 Pauling, L., The Nature of the Chemical Bond, Third Edition, Cornell University Press, Ithaca, New York, 1960.
 Allen, L.C., J. Am. Chem. Soc., 111, 9003, 1989.

LNG 
As quoted from these sources in: J.A. Dean (ed), Lange's Handbook of Chemistry (15th Edition), McGraw-Hill, 1999; Section 4; Table 4.5, Electronegativities of the Elements.
 L. Pauling, The Chemical Bond, Cornell University Press, Ithaca, New York, 1967.
 L. C. Allen, J. Am. Chem. Soc. 111:9003 (1989).
 A. L. Allred J. Inorg. Nucl. Chem. 17:215 (1961).

Allen Electronegativities 
Three references are required to cover the values quoted in the table.
 L. C. Allen, J. Am. Chem. Soc. 111:9003 (1989).
 J. B. Mann, T. L. Meek and L. C. Allen,  J. Am. Chem. Soc. 122:2780 (2000).
 J. B. Mann, T. L. Meek, E. T. Knight, J. F. Capitani and L. C. Allen, J. Am. Chem. Soc. 122:5132 (2000).

Chemical properties
Chemical element data pages